Gonojana velutina is a moth in the family Eupterotidae. It was described by Francis Walker in 1869. It is found in the Democratic Republic of the Congo.

Adults are fawn coloured, the forewings with an oblique, nearly straight postmedial line. The hindwings are ochraceous, except along the interior border.

References

Moths described in 1869
Janinae